Seventy-one singles made into top 10 of the Hot 100, the all-genre Billboard singles charts, in 2011. Sixty-eight acts had a top-ten hit during the year, with twenty achieving their first either as a lead or featured artist. Lil Wayne, Bruno Mars, and Rihanna each had six top-ten hits in 2011, tying them for the most top-ten hits during the year. LMFAO's "Party Rock Anthem" (featuring Lauren Bennett and GoonRock) had a twenty-six-week run in the top ten, the longest during the year and tying with Savage Garden's "Truly Madly Deeply" as the fourth-longest in Billboard history. In the beginning of 2012, the song re-entered the top ten, extending its run to twenty-nine weeks and becoming the fourth-longest-running top-ten single ever behind "How Do I Live" by LeAnn Rimes, "Smooth" by Santana featuring Rob Thomas and "Uptown Funk" by Mark Ronson featuring Bruno Mars, also bumping Jewel's You Were Meant For Me/Foolish Games down to fifth, with 28 weeks.

On the week ending April 30, 2011, singer Katy Perry extended her top ten streak beginning the previous year to forty-nine weeks, breaking a record held by Swedish pop band Ace of Base for seventeen years. Perry went on to log twenty more consecutive weeks in the top ten, extending her record to sixty-nine weeks, before "Last Friday Night (T.G.I.F.)" fell out of the top ten on the week ending September 24, 2011, ending her streak.

Rihanna attained her twentieth top-ten hit when "We Found Love" (featuring Calvin Harris) climbed into the top ten on the week ending October 15, 2011. This made Rihanna the fastest soloist to attain twenty top-ten hits, having done so in a six-year, four-month span, breaking a record previously held by singer Madonna.

Top-ten singles
.
.

[[File:LMFAO - Live Walmart (1).jpg|thumb|Electropop duo LMFAO had the longest-running top-ten single in 2011 with "Party Rock Anthem" (featuring Lauren Bennett and GoonRock), which remained in the top ten for twenty-six weeks, tying with Savage Garden's "Truly Madly Deeply" for the fourth-longest top ten run for a single in Billboard history. In 2012, the song spent three more weeks in the top ten, extending its run to twenty-nine weeks and becoming the third-longest-running top-ten single ever. The song spent six weeks at number one and became Billboards number-two single of 2011. LMFAO scored a second top-ten single in 2011 with "Sexy and I Know It", which reached number one in 2012.]]

Key
 – indicates single's top 10 entry was also its Hot 100 debut
 – indicates best performing song of the year
(#) – 2011 year-end top 10 single position and rankNotes:'''
Britney Spears was credited as a featured artist on the week ending April 30, 2011.
Nicki Minaj and Kesha were credited as featured artists on the week ending May 14, 2011.
Ludacris was credited as a featured artist on the week ending July 2, 2011.

2010 peaks

2012 peaks

Notes
The single re-entered the top ten on the week ending January 8, 2011.
The single re-entered the top ten on the week ending January 15, 2011.
The single re-entered the top ten on the week ending January 22, 2011.
The single re-entered the top ten on the week ending February 26, 2011.
The single re-entered the top ten on the week ending March 5, 2011.
The single re-entered the top ten on the week ending April 9, 2011.
The single re-entered the top ten on the week ending April 23, 2011.
The single re-entered the top ten on the week ending May 7, 2011.
The single re-entered the top ten on the week ending May 14, 2011.
The single re-entered the top ten on the week ending May 28, 2011.
The single re-entered the top ten on the week ending June 11, 2011.
The single re-entered the top ten on the week ending June 18, 2011.
The single re-entered the top ten on the week ending July 2, 2011.
The single re-entered the top ten on the week ending August 20, 2011.
The single re-entered the top ten on the week ending August 27, 2011.
The single re-entered the top ten on the week ending September 10, 2011.
The single re-entered the top ten on the week ending September 24, 2011.
The single re-entered the top ten on the week ending October 1, 2011.
The single re-entered the top ten on the week ending October 22, 2011.
The single re-entered the top ten on the week ending December 10, 2011.

See also
2011 in American music
List of Billboard Hot 100 number-one singles of 2011
Billboard Year-End Hot 100 singles of 2011

References

General sources

Additional information obtained can be verified within Billboard's'' online archive services and print editions of the magazine.

External links
Billboard.com
Billboard.biz
The Billboard Hot 100

United States Hot 100 Top Ten Singles
2011